Richard Covey may refer to:

 Richard O. Covey (born 1946), United States Air Force officer and former NASA astronaut
 Richard Covey (composer) (born 1979), Canadian composer